Pristimantis wiensi is a species of frog in the family Strabomantidae.
It is endemic to Peru.
Its natural habitats are tropical moist montane forests, high-altitude grassland, and heavily degraded former forest.

References

wiensi
Amphibians of Peru
Endemic fauna of Peru
Amphibians described in 1993
Taxonomy articles created by Polbot